Milton Academy (also known as Milton) is a highly selective, coeducational, independent preparatory, boarding and day school in Milton, Massachusetts consisting of a grade 9–12 Upper School and a grade K–8 Lower School. Boarding is offered starting in 9th grade. It is a highly selective school, accepting only 14% of applicants in the 2020–21 school year. Historically, it has been an unofficial feeder school for Harvard University.

Milton is a member of the Independent School League (ISL). Milton's historic athletic rival is Noble and Greenough.

History 

The original Milton Academy was founded by a Massachusetts bill granting a charter in 1798, but operations ceased in 1866 with the opening of the public Milton High School. The academy, however, was re-established in 1884 on a new 125-acre site by John Murray Forbes, with the approval of the old board of trustees.

Athletics 
Milton offers 15 interscholastic sports for both boys and girls each, as well as nine intramural teams. It is a member of both the Independent School League and the New England Schools Sailing Association division of the Interscholastic Sailing Association. Since 1886, Milton's traditional rival has been the Noble and Greenough School of Dedham. Recently, the ultimate team was ranked seventh in the nation and the varsity football team "entered the 2005 season with the best ten-year record of all ISL prep programs". Between 1998 - 2004 and led by coach Herb Chennel, The Boys' Tennis Team won the ISL Championship 6 times, and The New England Intercollegiate Tennis Championship 6 times. During that time Milton amassed a record of 74 wins and 1 loss. More than 10 players from those teams went on to Division I tennis careers. The coed sailing team has won two national championships—one in team racing and one in fleet racing. They have also won team racing worlds in 2015. Milton's boys' hockey team has had several players go on to successful professional careers, most notably 12-year NHLer Marty McInnis and current Boston Bruin Josh Hennessy. In 2011, Milton's boys hockey team won the New England Preparatory School Athletic Council (NEPSAC) championship. The team featured two NHL draft picks: Patrick McNally and Rob O'Gara.  In 2012, the Girls' Cross Country team placed 1st and the Boys' Cross Country team placed 2nd in the ISL, earning the team's highest finish in 25 years. In 2013 the Girls Track & Field team clinched the ISL title while the Boys did the same in 2015. The Boys' Varsity Soccer team earned a first-round bid in the playoffs for the NEPSC in 2013. In 2014 they went undefeated until a semi-final elimination in the playoffs but returned to a perfect untied and unbeaten 22–0 season the following year, earning the ISL title, the New England Class A championship and the ISL Sportsmanship award.

Controversies 
In February 2017, the academy announced the results of a nine-month sexual misconduct investigation by T&M Protection Resources. The firm interviewed 60 alumni, parents, current and former staff and came to the conclusion that four former employees had engaged in illegal sexual conduct with students in the 1970s and 80s. The most egregious abuse came from a drama teacher named Reynold Buono who had abused at least 12 male students before being terminated by the school in 1987. On June 27, 2018, Buono was arraigned in Norfolk Superior Court on three counts of rape of a child and three counts of rape of a child with force. Six of those counts were reversed in 2019 and four were reinstated in 2020 by the Massachusetts Supreme Judicial Court. The original District Attorney alleged the rapes happened while Buono was teaching at the school between 1975 and 1987. Buono was terminated in 1987 after admitting to molesting a student and had been living in southeast Asia.

In 2005, the school expelled five members of the boys varsity ice hockey team for rape/sexual assault of a female student. Following the county criminal investigation and prosecution by the state of Massachusetts, the three defendants over the age of 18 were found guilty of rape in adult court, and the two  who were 16 at the time of the incident were found guilty in juvenile court. This incident was used for fictional accounts in both print and a Lifetime movie.

Notable alumni

References

External links 
 Official website
 Milton Academy on Instagram. Archived from the original on ghostarchive.org
  

1798 establishments in Massachusetts
Boarding schools in Massachusetts
Co-educational boarding schools
Educational institutions established in 1798
Independent School League
Milton, Massachusetts
Private high schools in Massachusetts
Private preparatory schools in Massachusetts
Private middle schools in Massachusetts
Private elementary schools in Massachusetts
Schools in Norfolk County, Massachusetts